Meatballs Part II is a 1984 American comedy film and the in-name only sequel to the 1979 film Meatballs. The film stars Richard Mulligan, Hamilton Camp, John Mengatti, Kim Richards, Archie Hahn, Misty Rowe, and John Larroquette, and was directed by Ken Wiederhorn. The screenplay for the film was written by Bruce Franklin Singer based on a story by Martin Kitrosser and Carol Watson.

Plot
The owner of Camp Sasquatch, Giddy, tries to keep his camp open after Hershy, the owner of Camp Patton, located just across the lake, wants to buy the entire lake for Camp Patton. Giddy suggests settling the issue with the traditional end-of-the-summer boxing match over rights to the lake. A tough, inner city punk named Flash is at Camp Sasquatch for community service as a counselor-in-training.  Flash is recruited to box in order to save Sasquatch.  Cheryl, a naive teen on whom Flash has set his sights, has never seen a "pinky", so her fellow teenage girl campers arrange for her to see a man naked.  Meanwhile, the campers try to hide an alien from another planet who has been dropped off by his parents to learn Earth culture.  He is nicknamed "Meathead" by the kids after repeating one of them saying "Me, Ted".

Cast
 Richard Mulligan as Coach Giddy
 Hamilton Camp as Colonel Jack 'Batjack' Hershy
 John Mengatti as Armand 'Flash' Carducci
 Kim Richards as Cheryl
 Archie Hahn as Jamie / Voice of Meathead
 Misty Rowe as Fanny
 John Larroquette as Lieutenant Felix Foxglove
 Paul Reubens as Albert
 Joe Nipote as 'Boomer'
 Jason Hervey as Tommy
 Ralph Seymour as Eddie
 Elayne Boosler as Mother
 Nancy Glass as Daughter
 Felix Silla as 'Meathead'
 Joaquin Martinez as Chief Rawhide
 Blackie Dammett as Sergeant Paladin
 Donald Gibb as 'Mad Dog'
 Jason Luque as Jai Styxxx

Reception
Meatballs Part II grossed $2,515,268 the first week-end.    The film grossed $5,410,972 domestically overall.

Critical response
Critic Lawrence Van Gelder of The New York Times wrote in his review: "Trailing bits of Rocky and E.T. and using a plot device from the 1983 film Screwballs, which itself aspired to be Porky's, Meatballs Part II shares with 1979's Meatballs not much more than a summer camp setting. This time - amid the efforts of two senior counselors to find sexual privacy, amid prurience and budding romance involving an innocent blonde preppy and a young punk given a choice of a counselor's job or reform school, and amid the efforts of some of the little campers to harbor an extraterrestrial - the future of Camp Sasquatch is in peril.

Rotten Tomatoes lists only two critics' reviews, both of which are negative. Lawrence Van Gelder of the New York Times said, "Pallid writing, awkward acting, familiar situations and tired jokes make the morons, wimps and losers of Meatballs Part II easy to pass up." TV Guide reported, "The difference between this movie and the original is Bill Murray, whose charm gave the first film its best moments and raised the mediocre plot into something mindless but sweet." Meanwhile, 675 users have scored the movie with an average of 2.5 out of 5; only 23% of those users reported liking "Meatballs Part II."

Release
Meatballs Part II was released in theaters on July 27, 1984. The film was released on DVD on March 4, 2011, by Sony Pictures Home Entertainment.

References

Sources

External links
 MeatballsOnline Meatballs Movie Website

1984 films
1980s sex comedy films
American sequel films
American sex comedy films
1980s English-language films
Films directed by Ken Wiederhorn
Films about summer camps
TriStar Pictures films
Teen sex comedy films
1984 comedy films
1980s American films